The Exhibition of HSH The Prince of Monaco's Car Collection is an automobile museum in the La Condamine district of Monaco.

The cars were the personal collection of Prince Rainier III of Monaco (1923–2005), and assembled over a thirty-year period. The collection contains almost one hundred classic cars made in Europe and the United States. Notable cars in the collection include the Bugatti Type 35 driven by William Grover-Williams that won the inaugural Monaco Grand Prix in 1929, and Sébastien Loeb's Citroën DS3 WRC, which he drove to victory in the 2013 Monte Carlo Rally. 38 cars from the collection were put up for auction in 2012 due to Prince Albert II's desire to re-organise and expand the collection.

The cars are displayed over five levels in a specially constructed space in the Terrasses de Fontvieille, and the museum is open daily from 10am to 6pm, excluding Christmas Day and New Year's Day.

Gallery

See also

 List of museums in Monaco

References

Automotive museums
La Condamine
Museums in Monaco